William Russell (January 18, 1896 – October 18, 1958) was an American épée fencer. He competed at the 1920 and 1924 Summer Olympics. He graduated from Harvard University.

References

External links
 

1896 births
1958 deaths
American male épée fencers
Olympic fencers of the United States
Fencers at the 1920 Summer Olympics
Fencers at the 1924 Summer Olympics
Sportspeople from New York City
Harvard Crimson fencers